"Be-Bop Baby" is a song written by Pearl Lendhurst and performed by Ricky Nelson. The song reached #3 on the Billboard Hot 100 and #5 on the R&B chart in 1957. The song appeared on his 1957 album, Ricky.  Joe Maphis was the lead guitar on this recording.

The song ranked #42 on Billboard magazine's Top 50 songs of 1957.

Rockabilly musician Autry Inman also recorded the song

References

1957 songs
1957 singles
Ricky Nelson songs
Imperial Records singles